The FA Futsal Cup is a national competition organised by the Football Association in the game of futsal.

In 2005, Doncaster College for the Deaf became the first disability side to win a major open football competition.

Winners (Men)
2003 - Sheffield Hallam
2004 - Team USSR
2005 - Doncaster College
2006 - White Bear
2007 - Ipswich Wolves
2008 - Helvécia
2009 - Helvécia
2010 - Helvécia
2011 - Manchester Futsal Club
2012 - competition cancelled
2013 - competition cancelled
2014 - Baku United FC
2015 - Baku United FC
2016 - Oxford City Lions
2017 - Baku United FC
2018 - Helvécia
2019 - Helvécia

Winners (Women) 

2014 - University of Gloucestershire
2015 - Bristol City Futsal Club
2017 - South London Ladies Futsal Club
2018 - South London Ladies Futsal Club
2019 - Manchester Futsal Club

Finals

See also 
FA Futsal League

External links
Official website

Futsal competitions in England
England